27 Arietis is a binary star system in the northern constellation of Aries. 27 Arietis is the Flamsteed designation. It is a dim, yellow-hued star that is close to the lower limit of what can be viewed with the naked eye, having an apparent visual magnitude is 6.21.

This appears to be a single-lined spectroscopic binary system with an orbital period of 130.7 days and an eccentricity of 0.366. This value provides a lower bound on the actual semimajor axis. The CN bands of this star are very weak.

References

External links
 HR 731
 Image 27 Arietis

G-type giants
G-type subgiants
Spectroscopic binaries
Aries (constellation)
Durchmusterung objects
Arietis, 27
015596
011698
0731